This is a list of UK businesses entering administration during the 2008–2009 financial crisis.

UK insolvent businesses
LSE listed companies that entered administration, by date, due to the impacts of the post-summer-2007 credit crunch and/or the late 2000s recession.

Notes

Great Recession in the United Kingdom
Administration
2008 in the United Kingdom
2009 in the United Kingdom
2008 in economics
2009 in economics